Agyrtacantha dirupta is a species of dragonfly in the family Aeshnidae, 
commonly known as the trifid duskhawker. It has been found from the Maluku Islands through Australia to the Pacific.

Agyrtacantha dirupta is a large, dark dragonfly with green, brown and black colour variations. It inhabits still and brackish water. Adults are nomadic and fly at dusk.

Gallery

See also
 List of dragonflies of Australia

References

Aeshnidae
Odonata of Australia
Odonata of Oceania
Insects of Australia
Insects of Indonesia
Taxa named by Ferdinand Karsch
Insects described in 1889